The Car (Malayalam: ദി കാർ) is a 1997 Malayalam film directed by Rajasenan, and starring Jayaram, Janardhanan, Kalabhavan Mani, and Sreelakshmi. This movie is about two men whose car gets mistaken for another car being followed. This was the last movie  appearance of veteran actor K. P. Ummer.

Plot
Mahadevan and Kumaran work in a small firm and are room mates renting from Janakiamma. One day, luck comes to them when Mahadevan wins a car as the first prize of a promotional contest held by a washing-powder brand. Meanwhile, a murderer, Ambrose is after Maya. By mistake, both the murderer and Mahadevan get the same tag number on their cars' license plates. The murderers try a hit-and-run attack on Maya, but she escapes. She thinks that Mahadevan who did it. Mahadevan gets arrested by sub-inspector Cherian according to Maya's complaint. But due to lack of proper evidence, he's released with a warning. After getting through problems one after another, Mahadevan finds the real killers and their car. He tells Maya about the killers who attempted for her life. Shockingly it is revealed that one of the killers is Maya's cousin Vishnu who is after her wealth. Vishnu tries to kill Maya, but Mahadevan stops him. In an attempt to kill Mahadevan and Maya, Vishnu accidentally dies by being stabbed by a sharp object during the fight. In an attempt to dump his body, the couple is stopped by Vishnu's accomplice, Ambrose. He's enraged by his friend's death and tries to kill Mahadevan and Maya, but ends up at the dead end of the road, where the cops were waiting for him with an armed force. The car catches fire from the gunshots and explodes, killing him. The film ends with sub-inspector Cherian thanking Mahadevan and Maya, for their help and support.

Cast
Jayaram as Mahadevan 
Janardhanan as Kumaran 
Sreelakshmi as Maya 
Kalabhavan Mani as Police Sub Inspector Cherian
Indrans as Idiyan Vikraman / Policeman
Meena as Janakiyamma
Bindu Panicker as Usha 
Poojappura Ravi as Koshy
Kochu Preman as Valiyakulam Swamy / Kochappi
K. P. Ummer as Advocate
 Kalamandalam Kesavan as Maya's grandfather
 Abu Salim as Ambrose
 Jayakumar Parameswaran Pillai as Autorickshaw driver

Soundtrack 
The film's soundtrack contains 6 songs, all composed by Sanjeev and Lyrics by S. Ramesan Nair.

Box office
The film was an average grosser.

References

External links
 

1990s Malayalam-language films
1997 films
1990s crime comedy films
Indian crime comedy films
Films directed by Rajasenan
1997 comedy films